The Armenian Legion may refer to:

 Armenian Legion, a World War II unit in the German army composed of Armenian POWs
 Legio I Armeniaca, a legion of the late Roman Empire, created in the late 3rd century
 Legio II Armeniaca, a legion of the late Roman Empire, in the late 3rd century
 French Armenian Legion, a World War I unit in the French Army composed of Armenians